Legal High is a 2019 South Korean television series starring Jin Goo, Seo Eun-soo and Yoon Park. It is a remake of the award-winning 2012 Japanese TV series of the same title. It aired on JTBC from February 8 to March 30, 2019.

Synopsis
The series tells the story of two completely different lawyers who end up working together to win court cases for their clients.

Cast

Main
 Jin Goo as Go Tae-rim, an arrogant lawyer but has a 100 percent success rate in his cases.
Choi Seung-hoon as young Go Tae-rim
 Seo Eun-soo as Seo Jae-in, a passionate rookie and righteous lawyer.
 Yoon Park as Kang Ki-seok, an ace lawyer who is Tae-rim's rival. He is calm and gentle with a strong charisma.

Supporting

People around Tae-rim
 Lee Soon-jae as Goo Se-joong, a notable lawyer and the saviour of B&G Law Firm.
 Jang Yoo-sang as Kim Yi-soo, an informant.

People around Jae-in
 Moon Ye-won as Nam Sul-hee, Jae-in's university friend.
 Kim Ho-jung as Professor Song, Jae-in's guardian.
 Ahn Nae-sang as Seo Dong-soo, Jae-in's father.

B&G Law Firm
 Kim Byeong-ok as Bang Dae-han, the CEO of B&G Law Firm.
 Chae Jung-an as Min Joo-kyung, a partner lawyer who has a great source of information. Her looks contradicts her personality.
 Jung Sang-hoon as Yoon Sang-goo, an ambitious lawyer who dreams of beating Tae-rim.
 Gu Won as Sung Gi-jun, the heir of Hankang's Group.

Special appearances
 Joo Suk-tae as Lawyer Yoo (Ep. 1–2)

Production
The first script reading was held in December 2018 at the JTBC building in Sangam, Seoul with the attendance of the cast and crew.

Original soundtrack

Part 1

Part 2

Part 3

Part 4

Part 5

Part 6

Viewership

Notes

References

External links
  
 
 

JTBC television dramas
Korean-language television shows
2019 South Korean television series debuts
2019 South Korean television series endings
South Korean television series based on Japanese television series
South Korean legal television series
South Korean comedy television series